María Silvia Micaela Correa Marín is a Chilean Christian Democrat. She was a deputy for the Seventh Departmental Group, Santiago (Third District), Metropolitan Region, between 1965 and 1969. She also served as governor of the province of Maipo, under the mandate of President Patricio Aylwin, and later Chilean ambassador to Honduras under the presidency of Ricardo Lagos.

Political and public career
She began her political career by joining the Christian Democratic Party (PDC).
In 1990 she was appointed by President Patricio Aylwin as Governor of the province of Maipo. During this time, she did the corresponding paperwork to obtain an extension of land where she could make a park, a habitat that Saint Bernard. She thus obtained the land that is currently occupied by the Parque Metropolitano Sur Cerros de Chena, dependent on the Ministry of Housing and Urbanism (Minvu), and with the cooperation of the Municipality of San Bernardo. Likewise, she managed the construction of the new provincial government building.

On January 1, 2003, President Ricardo Lagos appointed her as Chilean ambassador to Honduras, a position she held for three years.
In 2010, she joined the meetings of the Illustrious Municipality of San Bernardo related to the maintenance and development of the Southern Metropolitan Park Corporation, Cerros de Chena, of the Minvu. She currently runs the said park.

References

Chilean politicians
Chilean women in politics
1929 births
Living people